Boags Commonwealth Marine Reserve is a 537 km2 marine protected area within Australian waters located off the coast of north-west Tasmania in Bass Strait. The reserve was established in 2007, and is the smallest reserve of the South-east Commonwealth Marine Reserve Network.

The reserve is a sample of the bottom-dwelling creatures that live in the sea-floor sediments and muds of Bass Strait, such as crustaceans, polychaete worms, and molluscs. It is an important foraging area for a variety of seabirds that nest on the nearby islands, particularly the Hunter Island Group which includes Three Hummock Island.

Protection
The entirety of the Boags marine reserve area is IUCN protected area category VI and zoned as 'Multiple Use'.

See also

 Commonwealth marine reserves
 Protected areas of Australia

Notes

References

External links
 Boags Commonwealth Marine Reserve Network website

South-east Commonwealth Marine Reserves Network
Protected areas established in 2007
Protected areas of Bass Strait